Western View is a historic home located near Fork Union, Fluvanna County, Virginia.  The original frame section was built about 1790, and expanded with a brick addition in 1824.  The original section is a -story, two bay, rectangular frame structure with a slate covered gable roof.  The brick addition is a one-over-one wing with Greek Revival attributes. Also on the property are the contributing site of the outdoor kitchen with extant chimney, and the Henley/Johnson family cemetery.

It was listed on the National Register of Historic Places in 2002.

References

Houses on the National Register of Historic Places in Virginia
Greek Revival houses in Virginia
Houses completed in 1824
Houses in Fluvanna County, Virginia
National Register of Historic Places in Fluvanna County, Virginia